Epipedobates machalilla is a slender species of frog in the family Dendrobatidae. The IUCN have classed it as "least concern".

Description
Their heads are longer than they are wide, and the tympanum is small. The forelimbs have a moderate length and the fingers are unwebbed. The toes do not have lateral fringes and the terminal discs are expanded. It is dark-coffee in colour with a gold iris and cream ventral surfaces.

Biology
The mating system of the Epipedobates machalilla includes cephalic amplexus. The female will produce around 15 eggs which are left on the ground or under leaves. The female will then leave, and the male will protect the development of the embryos and carry the larvae. When the tadpoles hatch (around 20 days after fertilization occurs), the male will take the tadpoles to riverbanks or pools of water so metamorphosis and growth can take place.

Epipedobates machalilla displays a cryptic phenotype despite being in the aposematic genus Epipedobates and likely lost an aposematic trait that evolved when Epipedobates first diverged. However, it is believed that with the high intra-specific phenotypic diversity observed within poison frogs and the role of diet in toxicity that there could be chemically defended E. machalilla populations.

Distribution
Epipedobates machalilla is endemic to West Ecuador, where it lives in dry and low forests. It mainly occurs in Azogues, Bolívar, El Oro, Guayas, Los Rios and Manabí and has been seen in the Choco rainforest. Recently, the population has been declining due to agriculture and logging.

References

Machalilla
Endemic fauna of Ecuador
Amphibians of Ecuador
Amphibians described in 1995
Taxa named by Luis Aurelio Coloma
Taxonomy articles created by Polbot